Nicolas Demuth, known by his stage name Parra for Cuva (born in 1991 in Göttingen) is a German electronic music producer and DJ.

Career

Life and early music career 
Nicolas Demuth grew up in a small town close to Göttingen in the state of Lower Saxony, Germany. 

When he was 11 years old he learned to play the piano and became interested in pieces of the French composer Debussy. After his piano teacher changed, he started to be engaged with jazz improvisations, with a focus on the jazz piano. In 2009,  Demuth started to print out midi piano notes with the help of a simple program, and then mixed his first piano pieces with hip hop elements. After his A-levels Demuth moved to Berlin to study audio design.

He first called himself "Natur-Klang" before he decided to choose the stage name "Parra for Cuva". His stage name originates in various Spanish words and means between the world / for / Cuva.

2013–2014 career
Nicolas Demuth and Anna Naklab grew up in the same town as neighbors and have been friends ever since their youth. Under the stage name Nianband they published different songs and had some local performances. Demuth took over the piano part whereas Naklab played the guitar and sang. The Nianband's musical focus was based on calm and rather relaxed compositions. 
In early 2013, Demuth and Naklab published "Fading Nights" on the French label Delicieuse Musique Records, followed by a joint production of "Something Near" on the label Well Done Music! from Berlin.

In September 2013, the cover (remix) single "Wicked Games" was released by Demuth and featured Naklab. The song is a cover version of Chris Isaak's "Wicked Games" and was published on the label Spinnin' Records. "Wicked Games" was released on Beatport, a U.S. based electronica website. A mainstream release in France in October 2013 was followed by a German release in February 2014. The song charted at number 6 in the United Kingdom. The song also charted in France, Belgium, Netherlands and other European nations. This popularity led to Demuth's international breakthrough.

In November 2013, the instrumental single "Luhya" was released on the label Delicieuse Musique Records. November 2013 also brought the Aérotique and Parra for Cuva release of the EP (short track album) titled Unique, with four tracks, on the label Sinnmusik. In February 2014, Demuth along with artist Egokind and Jona Mayr released an EP titled First Chapter, on the label Lenient Tales. Soon after, Demuth, Ascii Code and Viken Arman released the EP titled Veiled in Blue, on the label Traum/TRAUMV179.

2015: debut album: Majouré 
In January 2015, Nicolas Demuths debut album Majouré (French for "superior force") was released on the label Lenient Tales Recordings. It contained twelve songs, with iTunes offering a bonus song. The song "Devi" featured hip hop artist Nieve; the title track "Majouré" featured Casey K; and the song "Champa" features Monsoonsiren. All songs feature distinct foundations of electronic music mixed with a variety of musical influences of other genres.

2016: second album: Darwîś 
After finishing up their semester at university, Nicolas and Jonas – or Parra for Cuva & Senoy – packed their vehicle full of gear for a roadtrip to Spain where they recorded a new album. Inspired by the natural beauty of Spain's Mediterranean coast, the two were able to make enough content for an album. The duo spent the rest of the year back in Germany, mixing and arranging the pieces they had created. During the recording of the title song, the percussion track was accidentally left to loop, resulting in a trance-inducing meditative sound that gave them the idea for the title.

2017: Mood in C 
Mood in C is the latest EP by Parra for Cuva. Following the album Darwīš together with Senoy on Project Mooncircle, the release is a collection of songs that were created in and around the previous year. The title song "Mood in C" was composed after the Ethiopian pentatonic scale that is deeply intertwined with both the spirituality of the people but also the war-torn and deeply trenched history of the country. Furthermore, it combines guitar effects with synths and all sounds were recorded analog with the help of effects units. The song "Unfinished Colours" together with "Others" is the first collaboration of a future joint project of the two friends. All percussion was either recorded on journeys and travels or at home with everyday objects to give the EP a unique sound.

2018: Paspatou 
Parra for Cuva released Paspatou, in 2018.

2020: Parra for Cuva and Trashlagoon 
Parra For Cuva and Trashlagoon collaborated on "Hotel Moonlight". It was buoyed by groovy and emotional textures that further reveal themselves with each subsequent listen.

2021: Juno 
His new album Juno was released on 16 July 2021, with the single "Ordel" that already accumulated 2Mio+ streams. For the remix of "Her Entrance" Parra for Cuva teamed up with Innellea who was named best newcomer by Groove Magazine in 2017 and took the scene by storm with releases on Innervisions and a recent Cercle set at Jaisalmer Fort. Innellea´s interpretation of "Her Entrance" was shaped by his desire for extensive and intense club nights.

Music style 
The songs produced by Nicolas Demuth combine elements of house and pop music, piano compositions and downtempo. Many of his electronic pieces find their origin in piano music through sketches or with the help of complete solo pieces. Artists such as Ludovico Einaudi and Bonobo are Demuth's sources of inspiration next to many others. His set Plains of Ostara starts with Einaudis' piece Andare. Next to the piano many other instruments such as a kalimba, steeldrums, carillons, guitars and accordions can be found in Demuth's productions.

Discography

Studio albums

Extended plays

Singles

References

External links
 Parra for Cuva on Twitter
 Parra for Cuva on Facebook
 Parra for Cuva Official website

Living people
1991 births
Musicians from Göttingen
German DJs
German electronic musicians
Electronic dance music DJs